Pugaippadam is a 2010 Indian Tamil-language drama film written and directed by Rajesh Lingam. The cast includes Priya Anand,  Mrinalini, Yamini, Nandha, Shivam, Amzath Khan and Harish. The music was composed by Gangai Amaran with cinematography by Vijay Armstrong and editing by B. Lenin. The film released on January 1, 2010.

Plot 
Krishna, Nandha, Bala, Guru, Krithika Rao alias KK, and Gowri become friends in college. Shiney George joins their circle of friends, and soon, Shiney and Krishna fall in love. Gowri has been in love with Guru since they met. However, Guru refuses her advances, saying that they should not break their friendship. He and Krishna later fail a few exams. Afterward, Shiney slaps Krishna, and Guru fights with her. The group splits between boys and girls. They reunite after the interrogation of the lecturers. The group helps Guru and Krishna clear their debts and get jobs. Shiney's father also accepts his daughter's love. Krishna and Shiney reveal their love to their friends. However, that night, Bala commits suicide.

In the hospital, Gowri says that Bala died for Shiney because he was in love with her. Bala had admired Shiney from their first meeting and loved her when she supported him at the time of ragging. He told Gowri about these feelings that morning and decided to tell his friends before telling Shiney. The plan went awry when Shiney slapped Krishna and the friendship broke up. Guru became angry and rushed to the college.

In the college, Shiney and Krishna say that they will not marry because they feel guilty about Bala's death. Krithika says that it is only possible that they die together. Nandha tells her that they never would have been complete without their friend, whom they have lost forever. He also adds that if they all knew about anyone's love earlier, then they would not have lost Bala, meaning that they were not loyal to themselves or their friendship. After this, everybody cries and leaves the scene one by one.

Cast 

 Priya Anand as Shiney George
 Mrinalini as Gowri
 Yamini as Krithika Rao (KK)
 Nandha as Nandha
 Shivam as Guru
 Amzath Khan as Krishna
 Harish as Bala
 Venkat
 Vinu Chakravarthy
 Shanmuga Sundaram
 G. Gnanasambandam
 Neelima Rani

Production 
The film was announced in May 2008. The director was an associate of Selvaraghavan. The cast was almost entirely newcomers. The male lead, Amjad, was associated with Radio One. Priya Anand, whose second film Vaamanan was released before Pugaippadam was introduced. Orator and professor G. Gnanasambandam played an important role.

Release

Box office 
The film opened in only a few centers across Chennai, Tamil Nadu to a below average opening. The film grossed 170,670 in the opening weekend and failed commercially.

Reception 
The film received mixed reviews. Behindwoods.com claimed that the film "does manage to live up to the liveliness and energy that we associate with a campus movie" with the first half being "colorful and enjoyable with humor mixed at places", also giving praise to the "touching" climax. Sify gave the film a verdict of 'average' and wrote that "Let us hope Rajesh Lingam finds a more racy script in his next outing". Rediff gave the film a rating of two out of five stas and wrote that "If only Rajesh Lingam had kept the initial chemistry between the characters intact, we'd have had a cult classic. As it is, Pugaippadam now works only in parts".

Soundtrack 
The soundtrack was composed by music director Gangai Amaran.

References

External links 
 

2010 films
2010s Tamil-language films
2010s buddy drama films
Indian buddy drama films
Films scored by Gangai Amaran